is a 1993 Japanese animated science fiction adventure film which premiered on 6 March 1993 in Japan, based on the 13th volume of the same name of the Doraemon Long Stories series. It is the 14th Doraemon film.

Plot

Nobisuke watched a strange advertisement of a fantastic resort called Hotel Burikin on television at midnight. Sleepy as he was, he made a reservation even though he didn't even realize he was talking to the advertisement. The next day, when Nobita is upset because his family never goes on a holiday trip, he discussed with the family their holiday plans, telling Nobita and Doraemon that he had made a reservation at Hotel Burikin. Excited, Nobita tells Gian, Suneo, and Shizuka about it. However, Nobisuke and Nobita's mom cannot find Hotel Burikin anywhere on earth, and started to think if Nobisuke is just dreaming about it, much to Nobita's horror.

Afraid of breaking his promise to his friends, Nobita avoids them, but when he got home, he found a mysterious suitcase laying on the floor. When he unlocks it with its key, it opens a portal. He and Doraemon went through it, and discovers Hotel Burikin on the other side. The Hotel is run by tin robots, Clown, Tap, and a butler. After realizing that the hotel is actually free, Nobita and Doraemon enjoys their stay together. Although, Tap warns them not to enter the basement.

When Nobita and Doraemon visits a snow mountain nearby, they plan to ski, but Nobita, as usual, asks Doraemon for a gadget to help him. Although irritated, Doraemon gives Nobita a high powered ski, but Nobita sets off before he can fully explain how it works, much to the robots anger. Sure enough, Nobita cannot stop the ski and got separated from Doraemon. While Doraemon is searching for the boy with the take copter, he spots a zeppelin, thinking it is the hotel's staff. But unexpectedly, it shoots fireworks at him, knocking him out from the sky. Meanwhile, Nobita, worried that Doraemon left him from anger, returns to the hotel, expecting him to be there. But everyone, including the tin robots, are nowhere to be seen. When he takes a peek in the basement, a scary, talking door scares him off, and he returns home.

After getting knocked out, Doraemon found himself tied and carried by a group of small tin robot army. He breaks free easily, and finds a weird rocket nearby. When a small toy tank appears from it, it knocks Doraemon out again.

After days of not seeing Doraemon, Nobita assumed that the robot had returned to the future because he's so angry with him, feeling guilty of himself. Worse, after school, Gian and Suneo accuses him of lying about his holiday trip, while Shizuka defends him. Completely stoic, Nobita uses the suitcase to show them Hotel Burikin, even though the hotel staff is still nowhere to be seen. That evening, a group of hostile planes bombed and attacks the group. Using rocks and a tree, Gian and the group knocks the planes down, and crippling the bomber. Their chase leads to a mysterious rocket. Someone from inside the rocket reveals that he had Doraemon captive, and it takes off. Devastated, Nobita and the group swore to rescue Doraemon somehow. Suddenly, the Burikin island raises to the air, revealing itself to be a giant spacecraft. Before the group can return home with the suitcase, Tap appears, swallows the suitcase, and leads the group back to the hotel. The hotel staff is there, along with a boy called Burikin.

Burikin reveals that the one who attacked them is the army of Napo from planet Chamocha, and he has been escaping from planet to planet to avoid them. After some convincing, Nobita and the group decides to help Burikin since they have to save Doraemon too. During their way to planet Chamocha, Burikin reveals that humans in Chamocha had developed tin robots to help them in their daily lives. They created a super robot called Napogisutora, to help develop even more advanced robot technology. However, Burikin's father, Galion, realizes that if humans continue to depend on robots, they will become weaker because they're not using their own body. For this, Napogisutora made a 'solution' to invent the capsule for humans to move. The capsule is soon used by everyone in Chamocha. Galion, worried, takes his family to Hotel Burikin's basement, which is a labyrinth that leads into a secret lab. Soon, Galion and his wife is called by Chamocha's emperor, leaving Burikin behind. He soon found out that Napogisutora had started a robot revolution and captured all the humans, including Burikin's parents. He then escaped to space with the island.

Meanwhile, somewhere in Chamocha, Doraemon is interrogated about Hotel Burikin. Despite he didn't know anything, the robots keeps torturing him with high voltage shocks until he stopped working. The broken Doraemon is then dumped to the ocean.

Hotel Burikin landed on uncharted waters in planet Chamocha to avoid detection. The group then splits up, Gian and Suneo will go to Mechapolis via submarine with robot disguise to find out where the human prisoners are, while Burikin, Shizuka, Nobita, and Tap will find the lab in the hotel's basement with a robot mice to find their way. However, the hotel is discovered by Napogisutora's army and bombarded, causing the basement labyrinth to collapse. The robot mice were destroyed, leaving the rest of the group to try to find their own way. While in Mechapolis, Gian and Suneo finds the prison camp where the humans are held, but their disguises got blown, forcing them to run.

After unable to find their way in the labyrinth, Burikin and Tap sends Nobita and Shizuka home through the suitcase forcefully, not wanting them to be in their trouble, and swallows the suitcase again, making Nobita and Shizuka back on earth without being able to return to Hotel Burikin. However, Nobita suddenly remembers about Doraemon's spare pocket, and he and Shizuka uses it to find the broken Doraemon deep in Chamocha's ocean. They use a mini Dora to fix Doraemon, and he reunites happily with Nobita. They soon make their way to Hotel Burikin. With Doraemon's gadgets, they map the underground labyrinth and finds Burikin and Tap. Meanwhile, after stealing a plane from Mechapolis, Gian and Suneo crash landed on the north pole. They find a wooden cottage, and are surprised to see who lives there.

Doraemon and others managed to find the lab in the basement. Burikin finds a disc containing the most advanced robot virus, left by his father in case Napogisutora started an uprising. They plan to insert the virus into Napogisutora, who commands all the robots in Chamocha. Suddenly, something approaches Hotel Burikin, and to everyone's surprise, it is a Santa robot, bringing Gian and Suneo in his sleigh. He also brings toys, and Doraemon has an idea to use them to get to Mechapolis.

Using a submarine disguised as a whale, the group arrives at Mechapolis. Gian and Suneo uses giant toys to create chaos and distract Napo's army, Burikin and Shizuka frees the human prisoners, including Burikin's parents and the hotel staff, and Doraemon and Nobita inserts the robot virus and mini Dora into Napogisutora with a slingshot. When the virus takes effect, all the robots run amok, destroying each other and burning Mechapolis. Galion and the remaining human survivors, including Burikin, promises to rebuild their planet, without relying too much on robots.

Cast

Release
The film was released on 6 March 1993 in the theatres of Japan.

References

External links 
 Doraemon The Movie 25th page 
 

1993 anime films
1993 films
1990s dystopian films
Nobita and Tin-Plate Labyrinth
Animated films about extraterrestrial life
Films set in Sicily
Films directed by Tsutomu Shibayama
Films scored by Shunsuke Kikuchi
1990s children's animated films
Japanese children's films
Toho films